Aesculus californica, commonly known as the California buckeye or California horse-chestnut, is a species of buckeye native to California and southwestern Oregon.

Description
It typically is multi-trunked, with a crown as broad as it is high. Trees are long lived, with an estimated lifespan between 250–280 (300 maximum) years. The leaves are dark green, palmately compound with five (rarely seven) leaflets. The leaves are tender and prone to damage from both spring freezing or snow and summer heat and desiccation.

The seeds are poisonous and are the largest known of any temperate (non-tropical) plant species.

A. californica has adapted to its native Mediterranean climate by growing during the wet late winter and spring months and entering dormancy in the dry summer months, though those growing in coastal regions tend to hold on to their leaves until mid-autumn.

Distribution and habitat

The only Aesculus variety native to the West, A. californica is widely distributed in California, growing along the central coast and in the lower elevations of the Sierra Nevada and Cascade Range. Its range extends to the foothills of the Siskiyou Mountains in the Rogue Valley in Oregon.  A small disjunct population is found in the Chino Hills near Chino, California.

It is found growing in a wide range of conditions from crowded, moist, semi-shaded canyon bottoms to dry south-facing slopes and hilltops. In the coastal ranges north of Big Sur it is found growing alone on slopes, or intermingled with valley oak (Quercus lobata), Oregon oak (Q. garryana), coast live oak (Q. agrifolia) and California bay laurel (Umbellularia californica). In the foothills of the Sierra Nevada, A. californica can be found standing alone in grassland at the lowest elevations, intermingled in blue oak woodlands at intermediate elevations, and in mixed evergreen forests of black oak (Q. kelloggii), gray pine (Pinus sabiniana), ponderosa pine (P. ponderosa) and interior live oak (Q. wislizeni) as it nears the limit of its range.

Toxicity and uses

Native American tribes, including the Pomo, Yokuts, and Luiseño, used the poisonous nuts and seeds to stupefy schools of fish in small streams to make them easier to catch. The bark, leaves, and fruits contain the neurotoxic glycoside aesculin, which causes hemolysis of red blood cells. Buckeye also makes a good fireboard for a bow drill or hand drill.

Native groups occasionally used the plant as a food supply; after boiling and leaching the toxin out of the seeds or nut meats for several days, they could be ground into a flour or meal similar to that made from acorns. The nectar and pollen of the flowers is toxic to honeybees, so the trees should not be planted near apiaries. When the shoots are small and leaves are new, they are lower in toxins and are grazed by livestock and wildlife. The flowers are a rich nectar source for many species of butterflies, and squirrels and chipmunks consume the seeds.

It is used as an ornamental plant for its striking leaf buds, lime green foliage, fragrant white flowers, red-brown foliage in mid to late summer, and architectural silver branches through fall.
The tree also acts as a soil binder, which prevents erosion in hilly regions.

Etymology
'Aesculus' is Linnaeus' name for horse chestnuts. It is derived from the old Roman name for a different species, Quercus petraea.

'Californica' means 'native to California'.

References

Resources
Callahan F. 2005 Kalmiopsis Journal, Vol. 12, 2005 Plant of the Year, California Buckeye (Aesculus californica (Spach.) Nutt.) Native Plant Society of Oregon ISSN 1055-419X. (.pdf)

Jepson Flora Project: Aesculus californica
USDA Plants Profile for Aesculus californica (California buckeye)
Calflora database — Aesculus californica
Interactive Distribution Map of Aesculus californica
 Aesculus californica — U.C. Photo gallery

californica
Flora of California
Flora of Oregon
Plants used in Native American cuisine
Pre-Columbian California cuisine
Drought-tolerant trees
Ornamental trees
Flora without expected TNC conservation status